The Beaufort Theatre is the principal theatre in Blaenau Gwent, located in Ebbw Vale. 

Until 2 April 2017 It was part of the Blaenau Gwent Venues which also includes The Market Hall Cinema, Metropole Theatre and formerly Abertillery Community Theatre. It has been taken over as of 3 April 2017 by a community group, the theatre is still for hire to amateur groups for productions etc. It has a 338-seater auditorium and also has a Ballroom. It has a proscenium arched stage with an apron. The stage has some flying available, with 12 hemp sets, maximum flown height is 16ft. Lighting Bars can be lowered via a winch over stage, Front of House bars are fixed to the ceilings and walls. 

In its professional capacity, the venue used to programme professional theatre, music, contemporary dance and light entertainment. The theatre is also host to nine voluntary arts organisations who present their annual productions here. Many people may still remember the Theatre as it used to be: a cinema. It was converted back in the 1960s. Many famous bands have played in the Ballroom before making it big, these include Mott the Hoople and The Stereophonics

External links
Blaenau Gwent Venues

Theatres in Wales
Buildings and structures in Blaenau Gwent
Tourist attractions in Blaenau Gwent
Ebbw Vale